Chinatown, Johannesburg could refer to:
 Commissioner Street (Johannesburg), the old Chinatown
 Cyrildene, the new Johannesburg Chinatown